Langenhagen (Eastphalian: Langenhogen) is a town in the Hanover district of Lower Saxony, Germany.

History
From 1866 to 1868 Robert Koch worked in Langenhagen.

On June 18, 1972, Red Army Faction terrorist Ulrike Meinhof was arrested in Langenhagen.

On August 17, 1982, the world's first mass production of Compact Discs began in Langenhagen.

The Langenhagen standard, declared 1990 and sponsored by Brenneke is an industry standard for the minimal precision of shotguns and combination guns fit for hunting with shotgun slugs.

Subdivisions
Langenhagen consists of Langenhagen proper (including the Old Town, Brink, Langenforth and Wiesenau), Engelbostel (including Kananohe), Godshorn, Kaltenweide (including Altenhorst, Hainhaus, Maspe, Siedlung Twenge, Twenge and Kiebitzkrug), Krähenwinkel, and Schulenburg.

Economy
TUIfly is headquartered at Hanover Airport. Before TUIfly appeared, Hapag-Lloyd Flug (a.k.a. Hapagfly) was headquartered in Langenhagen.
 Bahlsen
 Brenneke
 Hermes Europe is currently building a new hub for northern Germany. It will be operational in January 2011.
 Konica Minolta
 MTU Aero Engines
 Reemtsma
 WAGNER Group GmbH

Politics

In 2001 the town council was elected for five years. The Christian Democrats and the Social Democrats won the election (both parties send 19 councilors to the council). The two "small" parties FDP (Free Democratic Party) and Bündnis 90/Die Grünen (Greens) received two seats each. Dr. Susanne Schott-Lemmer (CDU) is the mayor of Langenhagen. She won against the candidate of the Social Democrats with more than 60 percent.

On 10 September 2006 the town council was elected for five years. The Social Democrats won the election (send 19 councilors to the council). The FDP (Free Democratic Party) got two seats and Bündnis 90/Die Grünen (Greens) received four seats each. The Christian Democrats lost with only 16 seats. Dr. Susanne Schott-Lemmer (CDU) was not elected and is the loser of the elections. The new mayor of Langenhagen is Friedhelm Fischer from the Social Democrats with more than 52 percent.

Twin towns – sister cities

Langenhagen is twinned with:
 Southwark, London, United Kingdom
 Novo Mesto, Slovenia
 Głogów, Poland
 Le Trait, France
 Stadl-Paura, Austria

Notable people
Augustus Frederick Christopher Kollmann (1756–1829), organist and composer
Willy Max Rademacher (1897–1971), politician associated with the FDP
André Breitenreiter (born 1973), footballer

Gallery

See also

Metropolitan region Hannover-Braunschweig-Göttingen-Wolfsburg

References

Hanover Region